Moa Point is a small suburb in Wellington, New Zealand, situated on the south coast between Lyall Bay to the west and Tarakena Bay to the east. As of 2015 there were 21 households in the suburb.

Toponymy 
The suburb got its name in 1926 when the estate of HD Crawford sold 39 sections for a new housing area to be known as 'Moa Point Estate', described as "one of the warmest, sunniest and most sheltered positions in Wellington". The hill behind the housing estate was called Moa Point HIll: moa bones and gizzard stones and evidence of Māori occupation had been found in the area in the nineteenth century.

History 
The hill was flattened during construction of the Rongotai Aerodrome from the 1930s to the 1950s, with spoil used for reclamation in Lyall Bay and for other road works. Some houses at the northern end of Moa Point were relocated or removed and the promontory that existed there is now under the airport.

Environment 
Little blue penguins nest along Wellington's south coast, including at Moa Point where nesting boxes have been provided by Forest and Bird under their 'Places for Penguins' project.

Hue te Taka peninsula is a rocky platform about 500m long extending from Moa Point which becomes an island at high tide. It is home to penguins and many species of native plants.

Wastewater treatment plant 
Moa Point is known for its wastewater treatment plant, which treats sewage from the majority of Wellington city.  From 1899 until 1989, raw sewage was discharged into the inter-tidal zone at Moa Point.  A council proposal to continue to discharge untreated sewage at Moa Point with only milliscreening became a public controversy, and was a significant factor in the defeat of the incumbent mayor, Ian Lawrence by Jim Belich in the 1986 Wellington City mayoral election.  Milliscreening was added in 1989, as part of a transition to a land-based secondary treatment system.   

In 1995 Wellington City Council contracted British company Anglian Water International to provide a sewage treatment plant for Wellington at Moa Point, at a cost of $149 million. The facility opened officially in September 1998. The treatment process has several steps: liquid is screened to remove solids, then goes through settling tanks. After treatment with an agent to separate out bacteria, the liquid is treated with ultraviolet light to eliminate most remaining bacteria and viruses. The treated water is then discharged to the ocean in Cook Strait via a  marine outfall pipe.

The plant can discharge up to 260,000 cubic metres of wastewater per day. During periods of heavy rainfall the volume of wastewater coming in sometimes gets too high and the plant may need to discharge partly treated sewage into the ocean. If this happens warning notices are displayed at Moa Point and Lyall Bay and are notified online.

In May 2021, the Wellington City Council approved a 10 year plan that included expenditure of $2.7billion on water pipe maintenance and upgrades in Wellington city, and an additional $147 to $208 million for plant upgrades at the Moa Point wastewater treatment plant.

Animal shelter 
Wellington City Council operates an animal shelter located on the south coast adjacent to Moa Point.  The facility was constructed in 1968, and provides temporary shelter for a wide range of animals, mostly impounded and stray dogs, but also including wild birds and escaped domestic animals such as pigs.

See also 
 Water supply and sanitation in the Wellington region

References 

Suburbs of Wellington City